Continental Divide is an unincorporated community in McKinley County, New Mexico, United States.

Demographics

Description
The community has a post office with ZIP code 87312.

Education
The community is in Gallup-McKinley County Public Schools. Zoned schools are Thoreau Elementary School, Thoreau Middle School, and Thoreau High School.

Transportation

Major highways
  Interstate 40
  Historic U.S. Route 66
  New Mexico State Road 122

See also

References

External links

Unincorporated communities in McKinley County, New Mexico
Unincorporated communities in New Mexico